Blue Thunder is the helicopter in the 1980s American titular film and television series. The aircraft itself was a modified Aérospatiale Gazelle helicopter.

To film Blue Thunder, the producers employed two examples of the French-made Aérospatiale SA-341G Gazelle light utility helicopter, serial numbers 1066 and 1075, both built in 1973. After the film and TV series was made, both helicopters were sold to Michael E. Grube, an aviation salvage collector in Clovis, New Mexico. Sometime after, around 1985, one of the helicopters had a small role in the pilot episode of MacGyver, which featured the helicopter in a different paint job, the microphones were removed, the video surveillance package removed leaving empty mounting pylons in place, and the number on the side being changed from "02" to "51".

Grube then leased s/n 1066 (ex-) to a film company that was shooting Amerika, an ABC television mini-series about Soviet occupation of the United States; the helicopters were painted black with red tail stripe and numbering, missile launchers were installed on the pylons, and the surveillance microphones were removed on both. After Grube got 1066 back, it was dismantled and sold for parts.

The second, s/n 1075 (ex-), was scrapped during 1988.  There was a third static display model built for close-up shots with the actors; it was stored outside and after deterioration was scrapped by 2009. The bolt-on cockpit of the original helicopter used to be visible on the backlot tour of MGM Studios in Florida. It has not been present in the 'bone yard' since at least 2005.

Blue Thunder helicopter

For the movie SA-341G Gazelles were modified with bolt-on parts and a canopy patterned after the AH-64 Apache. Two helicopters were used in the filming of the movie, one for the actual stunts (a "stunt mule"), one as a backup in case the other was grounded for maintenance. Stunts were flown by Jim Gavin.

The helicopters were purchased by Columbia Pictures and flown to Cinema Air in Carlsbad, California, where they were heavily modified for the film. These alterations made the helicopters so heavy that various tricks had to be employed to make it look fast and agile in the film. For instance, the 360° loop maneuver at the end of the film was carried out by a 1/6-scale radio controlled model. (This aircraft was built and flown by modeller and RC helicopter manufacturer John Simone Jr.)

Fictional characteristics
Described in the film as having  "NORDOC-NATO armor." Blue Thunder had a chin turret with an electric  six-barrel rotary cannon capable of a rate of fire of 4,000 rounds per minute. Surveillance used twin cheek-mounted Nitesun spotlights, infrared thermograph, and airborne TV camera with 100:1 zoom and night-vision capability. The cameras fed  videotape, with a locker in the belly of the aircraft. External audio pickups were capable of hearing "a mouse fart at two thousand feet".  A "whisper mode" granted it the ability to operate in silence. It also has a "Turbine boost", a turbo boost function giving Blue Thunder increase speed, in the film it used it to help perform a 360° loop.

Blue Thunders cannon was controlled by a Harrison helmet in conjunction with a "Harrison Fire Control System", named after one of the special effects prop designers. The project cost was described as US$5 million.

The helmet-controlled gun turret and Target Acquisition and Designation Sights, Pilot Night Vision System (TADS/PNVS) is similar to that of the AH-64 Apache, which uses an "Integrated Helmet And Display Sight System" (IHADSS), wherein the nose-mounted sensors and the 30 mm chain gun are linked to the gunner's helmet.

See also
 Airwolf (helicopter)

References

External links
 Blue Thunder page on rotaryaction.com
 Blue Thunder unofficial home page

Fictional helicopters